James Grimshaw (1798–1857) was an Irish naturalist in the early 19th century.

Born in County Antrim, Grimshaw worked in his family's linen business. He married Mary Templeton, a daughter of the Irish botanist John Templeton.

Grimshaw was interested mainly botany and wrote numerous scientific papers, including "Flora of the Cave Hill". He was a founding member of both the Belfast Natural History Society and the Belfast Botanic Gardens. Part of his herbarium is now in the Ulster Museum.

References
Nash, R. and Ross, H.C.G. The development of natural history in early 19th century Ireland in From Linnaeus to Darwin: commentaries on the history of biology and geology Society for the bibliography of Natural History 13:27-

External links
Family Tree
Ulster Museum Herbarium.

1798 births
1857 deaths
Irish naturalists